A cigarette girl is someone who peddles or provides cigarettes in a casino, restaurant, theatre, or similar setting.

Cigarette Girl may also refer to:

Film
Cigarette Girl (1947 film), a 1947 American film
Cigarette Girl (2009 film), a 2009 American film
The Cigarette Girl, a 1917 American silent drama film
The Cigarette Girl from Mosselprom, a 1924 Soviet silent comedy film

Other
Cigarette Girl (manga), a manga by Masahiko Matsumoto
The Cigarette Girl from the Future, an album by Beauty Pill

See also

 
 , or